The Yeşilçam Academy Award was the national film award of Turkey, which was presented by the Yeşilçam Film Academy (YEFA) in 2012. The award, which was named after Yeşilçam Street in the Beyoğlu district of Istanbul where many film studios were based during the 1950s-1970s, was created by the Alliance of Cinema Labour Unions' Yeşilçam Film Academy (YEFA) in protest against Turkish Foundation of Cinema and Audiovisual Culture (TÜRSAK)'s disregard of their suggestions to give the Yeşilçam Award, which had been awarded from 2008 to 2011, a more professional structure. The Turkish Ministry of Culture and Tourism and the Beyoğlu Municipality, who had been organizers along with TÜRSAK of the previous awards, failed to offer their support to this new award. The First Yeşilçam Film Academy Awards, which was held on June 4, 2012 at the Cemal Reşit Rey Concert Hall (CRRKS) and broadcast live on the A Haber news channel, were described as a mess and have not been held again.

Awards

Best Film Award
 2012: Once Upon a Time in Anatolia directed by Nuri Bilge Ceylan

Best Director Award
 2012: Nuri Bilge Ceylan for Once Upon a Time in Anatolia

Best Actor Award
 2012: Taner Birsel for Once Upon a Time in Anatolia

Best Actress Award
 2012: Rüçhan Çalışkur for Turkan

Best Supporting Actor Award
 2012: Firat Tanis for Once Upon a Time in Anatolia

Best Supporting Actress Award
 2012: Idil Firat for Pomegranate

Best Cinematography Award
 2012: Gökhan Tiryak for Once Upon a Time in Anatolia

Best Editing Award
 2012: Bora Gökşingöl & Nuri Bilge Ceylan for Once Upon a Time in Anatolia

Best Screenplay Award
 2012: Nuri Bilge Ceylan, Ebru Ceylan & Ercan Kesal for Once Upon a Time in Anatolia

Best Music Award
 2012: Ozan Colakoglu for Love Likes Coincidences

Best Art Direction
 2012: Elif Taşçıoğlu for Shadows and Faces

Best Makeup
 2012: Mine Külcü & Deniz Görkem Duran for Once Upon a Time in Anatolia

Best Hair
 2012: Derya Ergün for The Extremely Tragic Story of Celal Tan and His Family

Best Costume Design
 2012: Hussein Özinal for Shadows and Faces

Best Sound
 2012: Okan Selçuk & Mehmet Kılıçel for Once Upon a Time in Anatolia

Best Sound Design
 2012: Thomas Robert for Once Upon a Time in Anatolia

Best Digital Effects
 2012: 1000 Volt for Love Likes Coincidences

Best Documentary
 2012: Last Nomads in Anatolia: Sarıkeçililer directed by Yüksel Aksu

Best Short Film
 2012: Magnus Nottingham directed by Ayçe Kartal

Box Office Smasher
 2012: Eyyvah Eyvah 2 directed by Hakan Algül

See also
 Yeşilçam Award

References

Awards established in 2012
Yeşilçam Award
2012 establishments in Turkey